The Little Cossatot River Bridge is a historic bridge in rural Sevier County, Arkansas. It is located just west of Lockesburg, carrying County Road 139H over the Little Cossatot River. The trusses were built by the Morava Construction Company of Chicago, Illinois, and are believed to be the only of the company's trusses in the state. They feature a top chord that is a solid I-beam, which is connected by riveted plates to the bottom chord. The trusses are set on cylindrical concrete piers on either side of the river.

The bridge was listed on the National Register of Historic Places in 1990.

See also
List of bridges documented by the Historic American Engineering Record in Arkansas
List of bridges on the National Register of Historic Places in Arkansas
National Register of Historic Places listings in Sevier County, Arkansas

References

External links

Road bridges on the National Register of Historic Places in Arkansas
Bridges completed in 1908
Transportation in Sevier County, Arkansas
Historic American Engineering Record in Arkansas
National Register of Historic Places in Sevier County, Arkansas
1908 establishments in Arkansas
Warren truss bridges in the United States